Alejandra García (born May 26, 1991, León, Guanajuato, Mexico), is a Mexican actress.

Television roles

Awards and nominations

References

External links 
 

1991 births
21st-century Mexican actresses
Living people
Mexican telenovela actresses
Mexican film actresses
Actresses from Guanajuato
People from León, Guanajuato